Electra Waggoner Biggs (November 8, 1912 – April 23, 2001) was a Texas-born heiress, socialite and artist, and owner of the Waggoner Ranch in Texas.  She is widely known for her sculptures of Will Rogers,  Dwight Eisenhower, Harry Truman, Bob Hope, Knute Rockne and numerous other prominent subjects.   

Both the Lockheed L-188 Electra turboprop, and the Buick Electra, were named after Biggs, the latter by her brother-in-law, Harlow H. Curtice, former president of Buick and later president of General Motors.

Biography
Biggs was born on November 8, 1912 and was named after her aunt, Electra Waggoner, after whom the town of Electra, Texas is named. Her father, E. Paul Waggoner, was an heir to the Waggoner Ranch in Texas. Her mother Helen was a socialite.

Biggs grew up in a privileged family and attended Miss Wright's Boarding School in Pennsylvania, where she discovered a love of art — later studying sculpture in New York and at the Sorbonne in Paris. Ultimately becoming well-known as a sculptor, a large collection of Biggs' works are featured at the Red River Valley Museum in Vernon, Texas.

Biggs married Gordon Bowman in 1933, divorcing two years later — their wedding was photographed by Edward Steichen. Her second husband, John Biggs, worked for International Paper and together they had two daughters, Helen Biggs Willingham of Vernon, Texas and Electra (Ellie) Biggs Moulder of Jacksonville, Florida.

As well as living at the Waggoner Ranch, Biggs maintained a home at 4700 Preston Road in Dallas, designed by locally noted architect Anton Korn.

She died on April 23, 2001.

Sculptures
Most of the sculptures Biggs created were portraits. They include:

 US President Harry Truman
 US Vice President John Nance Garner
 General (later US President) Dwight Eisenhower
 Sid Richardson
 Victor McLaglen
 William Thomas Waggoner
 Amon Carter Jr.
 Jacqueline Cochran
 Baron Von Wrangle, an Arrow Collar Man
 Will Rogers
 Jimmy Robinson
 Knute Rockne
 Frank Phillips
 Jack Chrysler
 Herbert Marcus

References

1912 births
2001 deaths
People from Fort Worth, Texas
American socialites
American women sculptors
Sculptors from Texas
20th-century American sculptors
20th-century American women artists